The enzyme 4-(2-carboxyphenyl)-2-oxobut-3-enoate aldolase catalyzes the chemical reaction

(3Z)-4-(2-carboxyphenyl)-2-oxobut-3-enoate + H2O  2-formylbenzoate + pyruvate

This enzyme participates in naphthalene and anthracene degradation.

Nomenclature 

This enzyme belongs to the family of lyases, specifically the aldehyde-lyases, which cleave carbon-carbon bonds.  The systematic name of this enzyme class is (3Z)-4-(2-carboxyphenyl)-2-oxobut-3-enoate 2-formylbenzoate-lyase (pyruvate-forming). Other names in common use include 2'-carboxybenzalpyruvate aldolase, (3E)-4-(2-carboxyphenyl)-2-oxobut-3-enoate, 2-carboxybenzaldehyde-lyase, and (3Z)-4-(2-carboxyphenyl)-2-oxobut-3-enoate 2-formylbenzoate-lyase.

References 

 

EC 4.1.2
Enzymes of unknown structure